Rashid Meer (1 June 1950 – 11 May 2021) was a Gujarati ghazal poet, critic, editor and researcher from India.

He was a founder editor of Dhabak, a Gujarati ghazal poetry journal. He received his Ph.D. His significant works include Saat Suka Pandada (1993), Ghazal Nu Pariprekshya (1995), Thes (1998) and Adhakhula Dhwar (1999). The Indian National Theater, Mumbai conferred the Shayda Award (2003) on him for his contributions to Gujarati ghazal poetry.

Biography 
Meer was born in Thasra, a village in Padal of Kheda district to Kamaluddin Meer and Halima Meer. He completed his S.S.C. in 1968 from Sharada Mandir High School, Menpura. He completed a Bachelor of Arts degree in 1973 at Arts and Commerce College, Balasinor and Master of Arts in 1975 from C. B. Patel Arts College, Nadiad with Gujarati literature as one of his subjects. He completed his B. Ed. in 1980 from Faculty of Education, Maharaja Sayajirao University of Baroda and obtained his Ph.D. for his dissertation Gujarati Ghazal Ni Saundarya Mimansa from the same university.

He died of COVID-19 on 11 May 2021 at Vadodara.

Career 
Meer started his career as a teacher at M.E.H Girls High School, Vadodara. He started his writing career in 1968 with influences of Ghalib, Faiz, Jigar Moradabadi and Kalidasa. In the same year, his ghazal came out for first time in Gujarati magazine Jay Jay. He served as an administrator of Muslim Educational Society, Vadodara and wrote column Gulchhadi in Gujarat Samachar on every Tuesday. He was a founder editor of Gujarati ghazal poetry journal Dhabak in 1991.

Works 
His first ghazal anthology, Thes,  was published in 1985, followed by Chitkaar (1987), Saat Suka Pandada (1993), Khali Hathno Vaibhav (1996), Adhakhula Dhwar (1999), Rubaru (2002) and Laapata ni Shodh (2010).

Criticism 
His criticism of ghazal poetry includes;
 Gujarati Ghazalni Saundarya Mimansa (1990; Ph.D. theses)
 Ghazal Nu Paripreksha (1995)
 Aapna Ghazalsarjako (1996)
 Ghazal Vivaksha (2000)
 Ghazal Vilokana (2001)
 Ghazal Lok (2008)
 Jigar Muradabadi (2002)
 Faiz Ahmed Faiz (2005)
 Ghazal Vanchana (2015)

Compilation 
 Ghazal Nu Shil Ane Saundarya (1988)
 Ghazals From Gujarati (English translation of selected Gujarati ghazals; 1996)
 Ghazal Vimarsh (1998)
 Suralay (2001)
 Diwan-e-Patil (Unpublished works of Patil; 2003)
 Gulchhadi Vol. 1 (2010)

See also
 List of Gujarati-language writers

References

Gujarati-language writers
Gujarati-language poets
Poets from Gujarat
1950 births
2021 deaths
Deaths from the COVID-19 pandemic in India
Indian magazine editors
People from Vadodara district
Maharaja Sayajirao University of Baroda alumni
Indian male poets
Indian magazine founders